BPQ or bpq may refer to:

 Bird Protection Quebec, the oldest organization of birders in Quebec
 BPQ, the Indian Railways station code for Balharshah Junction railway station, Maharashtra, India
 bpq, the ISO 639-3 code for Bandanese Malay, Banda Islands, Indonesia